Franz Stadion, Graf von Warthausen (27 July 1806 – 8 June 1853), was an Austrian nobleman and a statesman.

Biography 
Franz was a son of the Austrian diplomat Count Johann Philipp von Stadion-Wartshausen and his wife, Countess Maria Anna von Stadion-Thannhausen (1777-1841). Born in Vienna, he was a statesman who served the Austrian Empire during the 1840s. From 1841 he was Governor of the Austrian Littoral (with its capital at Trieste), from 1847 to 1848 Governor of Galicia (where he freed the peasants from labor duties), and from 1848 to 1849 he was Interior Minister and Minister of Education.  He advocated constitutional government, decreed the Imposed March Constitution in March 1849 which was never enacted, and in 1849 promulgated the Gemeinde (municipality) legislation that granted governmental autonomy to all municipalities in the Austrian empire.  Lewis Namier, in 1848: The Revolution of the Intellectuals (p. 18), calls him "one of the most enlightened and efficient Austrian administrators."

External links 
 AEIOU | Franz Stadion, Graf von Warthausen

Bibliography
 R. Hirsch, Franz Graf Stadion (Vienna, 1861).
 Rudolph Mattausch, "Franz Graf Stadion (1806-1853)" in Neue österreichische Biographie ab 1815: grosse Österreicher, vol. XIV (Zurich-Leipzig-Vienna, 1960), pp. 62-73.

1806 births
1853 deaths
Politicians from Vienna
Counts of Austria
Governors of the Kingdom of Galicia and Lodomeria
Knights of Malta